Joseph Birbeck (15 April 1932 – 11 March 2016) was an English professional footballer who played as a wing half in the Football League for Middlesbrough and Grimsby Town.

References

1932 births
2016 deaths
People from Stanley, County Durham
Footballers from County Durham
English footballers
Association football wing halves
Spennymoor Town F.C. players
Middlesbrough F.C. players
Grimsby Town F.C. players
South Shields F.C. (1936) players
English Football League players